Ioan Constantin Filip (born 20 May 1989) is a Romanian professional footballer who plays as a defensive midfielder for Universitatea Cluj.

Club statistics

Updated to games played as of 13 March 2023.

Honours

Club
Luceafărul-Lotus Băile Felix
 Liga III: 2007–08

Oțelul Galați
 Liga I: 2010–11
 Supercupa României: 2011

Viitorul Constanța
Liga I: 2016–17

References

External links

1989 births
Living people
People from Bihor County
Romanian footballers
Association football midfielders
FC Bihor Oradea players
CS Luceafărul Oradea players
ASC Oțelul Galați players
FC Petrolul Ploiești players
FC Viitorul Constanța players
Debreceni VSC players
FC Dinamo București players
FC Universitatea Cluj players
CS Gaz Metan Mediaș players
Liga I players
Liga II players
Liga III players
Nemzeti Bajnokság I players
Romanian expatriate footballers
Expatriate footballers in Hungary
Romanian expatriate sportspeople in Hungary
Association football defenders